Miseno is one of the frazioni of the municipality of Bacoli in the Italian Province of Naples. Known in ancient Roman times as Misenum, it is the site of a great Roman port.

Geography
Nearby Cape Miseno marks the northwestern end of the Bay of Naples.

History

According to mythology, Misenum was named after Misenus, a companion of Hector and trumpeter to Aeneas. Misenus is supposed to have drowned near here after a trumpet competition with the sea-god Triton, as recounted in Virgil's Aeneid.

In 39 BC, Misenum was the site where a short-lived pact was made between Octavian (heir of Julius Caesar, who later became the emperor Augustus), and his rival Sextus Pompeius.

Misenum was first established as a naval base (Portus Julius) during the civil wars in 27 BC by Marcus Agrippa, the right-hand man of the emperor Augustus. It was then developed into the largest Roman port for the Classis Misenensis, the most important fleet.

With its gorgeous natural setting close to the naval base and the nearby important Roman cities of Puteoli and Neapolis, Misenum also became the site of Roman luxury villas, such as the Villa of Lucullus.

 Pliny the Elder was the praefect in charge of the naval fleet at Misenum in AD 79, at the time of the eruption of Mount Vesuvius, visible to the south across the Bay of Naples. Seeing the beginnings of the eruption, Pliny left for a closer view and to effect a possible rescue, and was killed during the eruptions. The account of his death is given by his nephew Pliny the Younger, who was also resident in Misenum at the time.

Notable residents
In his Second Philipic, Cicero mocked Antony for owning a property at Misenum (bequeathed to Antony by his paternal grandfather), since it was shared with co-owners, having been mortgaged due to Antony's debts. 

The powerful and influential Roman empress Agrippina the Younger lived in a palace here, once owned by the orator Hortensius (then by the emperors, and some three centuries later by Symmachus) in which she resided in the months before her death. Misenum is also the place of death of Emperor Tiberius. 

Misenum is said to be the birthplace of Saint Sossius, a deacon who was martyred with Proculus of Pozzuoli.

In fiction
Misenum is one of the main settings in Robert Harris' novel Pompeii, whose protagonist, Attilius, works as the aquarius at the Piscina Mirabilis (the terminal reservoir into which the Aqua Augusta aqueduct emptied).

In the novel Ben-Hur, Misenum is the location of a villa owned by Quintus Arrius later bequeathed to his adopted son Judah Ben-Hur.  The Ben-Hur family would later live in Misenum.

References

External links

The Church of St. Sossio in Miseno

Frazioni of the Province of Naples
Roman sites of Campania
Roman towns and cities in Italy
Bacoli
Roman harbors
Roman harbors in Italy
Archaeological sites in Campania